Robert Sullivan (born 28 June 1944) is a British judoka. He competed in the men's half-middleweight event at the 1972 Summer Olympics. In 1973 he married Welsh singer Bonnie Tyler.

References

External links
 

1944 births
Living people
British male judoka
Olympic judoka of Great Britain
Judoka at the 1972 Summer Olympics
Place of birth missing (living people)
20th-century British people